Ethylene-responsive element binding protein (EREBP) is a homeobox gene from Arabidopsis thaliana and other plants which encodes a transcription factor. EREBP is responsible in part for mediating the response in plants to the plant hormone ethylene.

References

External links
 

Transcription factors